"Gabonia" is a genus from the family of Porphyromonadaceae, with one known species ("Gabonia massiliensis").

References

Bacteroidia
Bacteria genera
Monotypic bacteria genera